Ptochus pyriformis, is a species of weevil found in Sri Lanka.

Description
This species has a body length is about 3.75 mm. Body pyriform and piceous in color, with uniform dense grey scales. Eyes are subdorsal and moderately convex. Forehead broadly impressed. Rostrum rather broader than long. Antennae ferruginous. Prothorax broader than long, with much narrower apex, whereas the basal margin is shallowly bisinuate. Scutellum distinct and small. Elytra pear-shaped. Elytral striae are shallow punctate and without scales.

References 

Curculionidae
Insects of Sri Lanka
Beetles described in 1916